Rev. John Clay (J.C.) Coleman was an American-Canadian minister, theologian, and black rights activist born to freed slaves in Durant, Holmes Co., Mississippi in 1871. He travelled to Canada seeking Christian ordination, and was ordained by the African Methodist-Episcopal Church in 1895. 

Coleman was accepted as the "first coloured student" at Victoria University, Toronto, ON, where he was a member of the 1897-98 Specialist Class of Theology. Shortly thereafter, he published a book titled The Jim Crow Car: Denouncement of Injustice Meted Out to the Black Race, condemning the racial atrocities of the American South.

Early years 
Coleman was one of seven children born to Peter Coleman and Rowena Harrington, both of whom had been slaves on Tome Bigbee River, Alabama before being sold to a plantation owner in Mississippi.

He was raised in a Methodist Christian family, passionate about scripture and the education of youth.

Career 
Coleman was ordained by Bishop H. M. Turner in 1895 at the Annual Conference of the A. M. E. Church, before enrolling as a divinity student at Victoria College, Toronto.

He vocally condemned racial segregation in the American South, writing and preaching on the subject in the USA and Canada. Coleman contributed extensively to the efforts of the Methodist Church and held administrative positions of authority, notably:

 Presiding Elder and General Superintendent of the A.M.E. Church in the Maritime Provinces of Canada
 Chairman at the meeting of "white Methodist preachers" in Halifax in 1903-04
 Invited by the Governor of Nova Scotia to serve on the 1901 Reception Committee of the Duke and Duchess of Cornwall and York
 Wrote content for the thirty-two volume Canadian Encyclopedia of African Methodism in Canada

References

African-American Christian clergy
African-American male writers
1876 births
Year of death missing